Llechylched is a hamlet in Anglesey, Wales.

References 

Villages in Anglesey